The LKL All-Star Game is the All-Star Game of the professional Lithuanian Basketball League (LKL). The game is held once every year. The participants of the game are chosen in two ways: the first is via fan ballot, with the leading vote recipients at each position starting the game; secondly the reserves are chosen by a vote among the head coaches of each squad. Coaches are not allowed to vote for their own players. If a player is injured, and cannot participate, the league's commissioner will select a replacement.

Features
The All-Star Game is played under normal FIBA rules, but there are notable differences from an average game.

The player introductions are usually accompanied by a significant amount of fanfare, including lighting effects, dance music, and pyrotechnics. Special uniforms are designed for the game each year, usually green for the Lithuanians, and white for the Time Team (non Lithuanians). A major recording artist typically sings the national anthem, prior to tip-off.

Game play usually involves players attempting spectacular slam dunks and alley oops. Defensive effort is limited, and the final score of the game is generally much higher than an average LKL game. The coaches also try to give most of the reserve players some playing time on the court, instead of using a limited rotation, as they would in a normal game. The fourth quarter of the game is often played in a more competitive fashion, if the game is close.

Halftime is also longer than a typical LKL game, due to musical performances, by various artists.

Every few years, LKL alternates matches from Lietuviai and Time Team (Lietuviai being the All-Star Lithuanian team, and Time Team being the All-Star foreigner team) to Vilkai and Ereliai (two teams of mixed foreign and Lithuanian players).

Results

Other events

The All-Star Game is the featured event of the All-Star Day, which also includes a number of popular exhibition games, and competitions featuring LKL players. Such as the LKL Three-point Shootout and the LKL Slam Dunk Contest.

See also
LKL All-Star Day
LKL Three-point Shootout
LKL Slam Dunk Contest
LKL All-Star Game MVP

References

      
Basketball all-star games